Édouard Beugniot (1822-1878) was a French engineer, designer of the Beugniot lever, a system for articulating the driving axles of railway locomotives.

Career
Jean Gaspard Edouard Beugniot was born in Masevaux on 12 February 1822. His parents were Jean Claude Beugniot, who worked at the spinning factory of Nicolas Koechlin in the same city, and Henriette Berger-Pfeffel. At age 15, Édouard Beugniot left Masevaux to go to Mulhouse as an apprentice mechanic in the foundry of André Koechlin & Cie, whose founder André Koechlin was the first cousin of Nicolas Koechlin.

In 1844, Édouard Beugniot was 22 when he was appointed head of the locomotive department of André Koechlin & Cie. Two years later he qualified as a civil engineer. When the company became Société Alsacienne de Constructions Mécaniques, he directed the locomotive construction sector at the Mulhouse plant and worked with Alfred de Glehn. Beugniot designed a system for articulating the driving axles of railway locomotives, known as the Beugniot lever.

Family
Édouard married Maria Charlotte Clémentine Leydle. They had only one child, Marie Jeanne Claudine Henriette Beugniot born in 1859, who married Auguste Jean Hyacinthe Salin in 1878.

Death
Édouard Beuniot died on 25 October 1878. He is buried in the Cemetery rue Lefebvre in Mulhouse. His grave has a bust signed Wiedmaier with, on the pedestal, the inscription "To Edouard Beugniot, engineer, his workers and his collaborators".

Publication

    Édouard Beugniot et Lebleu, Mémoire sur une locomotive de montagne système E.Beugniot construite par MM.A.Koechlin et Cie : suivi du rapport présenté au nom du comité de mécanique sur la locomotive de montagne de M.E.Beugniot (séance du 28 novembre 1860), Mulhouse, A.Koechlin et Cie, 1860, 97 p..

Honours

    Chevalier de l’ordre des Saints Maurice et Lazare (from King Victor Emmanuel)
    Officier de l’ordre de Charles III (from the Spanish government)

References

Further reading

    Roland Oberlé, « Édouard Beugniot », in Nouveau dictionnaire de biographie alsacienne, vol. 3, p. 206
    René Limacher, « Jean Gaspard Edouard Beugniot Ingénieur Civil », Patrimoine Doller - Bulletin, no 12, 2002, p. 50-53
    Nicolas Stoskopf, André Koechlin & Cie, SACM, Wärtsilä, histoire de la Fonderie (D’Giesserei) à Mulhouse (1826-2007) : Extrait de l’ouvrage, paru en 2007 sous le titre SACM, quelle belle histoire !, HAL archives ouvertes, 2010, 73 p. (lire en ligne [archive]), chap. I (« André Koechlin & Cie (1826-1872), une société, un patron, une usine… »), p. 2-33.

1822 births
1878 deaths
French people in rail transport
French railway mechanical engineers